Ludwig van Beethoven's Piano Sonata No. 7 in D major, Op. 10, No. 3, was dedicated to the Countess Anne Margarete von Browne, and written in 1798. This makes it contemporary with his three Op. 9 string trios, his three Op. 12 violin sonatas, and the violin and orchestra romance that became his Op. 50 when later published. The year also saw the premiere of a revised version of his second piano concerto, whose original form had been written and heard in 1795.

Structure

It is divided into four movements:

Analysis 
The Op. 10 sonatas are usually described as angular or experimental, as Beethoven began moving further and further away from his earlier models. This third sonata of the set is the longest at approximately 24 minutes. It is the only one of the Op. 10 sonatas that has four movements. The second movement is famous for its intimations of later tragic slow movements, as well as for its own beauty.

I. Presto 

The first movement is in sonata form.

II. Largo e mesto 

The second movement is in ternary form.

III. Menuetto: Allegro 

The third movement is in ternary form.

IV. Rondo 

The fourth movement is in rondo form.

References

External links
 A lecture by András Schiff on Beethoven's piano sonata Op. 10, No. 3
 For a public domain recording of this sonata, visit Musopen
 
 
 Recording by Paavali Jumppanen, piano from the Isabella Stewart Gardner Museum

Piano Sonata 07
1798 compositions
Compositions in D major
Music with dedications